Romain Arneodo and Hugo Nys were the defending champions but chose not to defend their title.

Fabrício Neis and Fernando Romboli won the title after defeating Sadio Doumbia and Fabien Reboul 6–4, 7–6(7–4) in the final.

Seeds

Draw

References

External links
 Main draw

Internazionali di Tennis di Manerbio - Trofeo Dimmidisì - Doubles
2019 Doubles